The Surajaya Stadium or Stadion Surajaya is a multi-use stadium in the village of Sidorejo, in Lamongan, East Java, Indonesia. It is used mostly for football matches and as the home stadium for Persela Lamongan. The stadium has a capacity of 30,000 people.

References

Sports venues in Indonesia
Football venues in Indonesia
Buildings and structures in East Java